Election of the President of European Conservatives and Reformists was held on 8 March 2011. Election was held after the previous president Michal Kaminski quit the group. Candidates included Czech MEP Jan Zahradil, British MEP Timothy Kirkhope and  Polish MEP Ryszard Legutko. Kirkhope was considered the favourite to become the new president as the Conservative Party dominated the group. He was defeated by Zahradil who became the new president.

Background
Michal Kaminski was elected the President of European Conservatives and Reformists in 2009. He was a member of the Polish Law and Justice party. His party was accused of far-right politics. He resigned in January 2011 after having faced 'aggression' and 'hatred' from his colleagues in the party.

On 28 January 2011, member of Czech Civic Democratic Party Jan Zahradil announced his candidacy. Zahradil started to seek support for his candidacy. He stated that he would try to attract more deputies to the group and improve its communication strategy if he becomes the new president. Zahradil was supported by the Czech Prime Minister Petr Nečas.

Timothy Kirkhope stated on the same day that he might seek Conservative Party nomination for the president.

Polish MEP Ryszard Legutko announced his candidacy on 17 February 2011. His candidacy has put the Law and Justice party on a collision course with British MEPs. Legutko's candidacy caused controversy due to his views on Gay rights.

Candidates
Timothy Kirkhope, British MEP and member of Conservative Party. He was the most Pro-European candidate and the least controversial. He is a former Minister of British government and an experienced politician.
Ryszard Legutko, Polish MEP and a member of Law and Justice. His candidacy was considered very controversial, and he is known for negative opinions of homosexual rights.
Jan Zahradil, Czech MEP and member of the Civic Democratic Party (ODS). He is known to be a protégé of the Czech President Vaclav Klaus and the leading climate change denier in the Parliament. He actively promoted documentary ‘The Great Global Warming Swindle’.

ECR Group members
All 54 MEPs who were members of ECR were allowed to vote.

Voting

Legutko withdraw from the election in last minutes. Kirkhope was expected to win majority of 54 MEPs but he received only 18 votes while Zahradil 36. Zahradil thus became the new president.

Afterwards
The result was considered a defeat to Conservative Party and British Prime Minister  David Cameron. Prominent members of the Labour Party used the result to attack Cameron.

Zahradil became the first Czech to be a president of a group in European parliament. The Civic Democratic Party considered the result a huge success. Zahradil's term was only contemporary as it would end in December 2011. Zahradil decided to not seek reelection. Zahradil instead ran for leadership of Alliance of European Conservatives and Reformists.

References

2011 elections
European Conservatives and Reformists